Dothiorella dominicana is a fungal plant pathogen.

References

External links
 USDA ARS Fungal Database

Fungal plant pathogens and diseases
dominicana
Fungi described in 1930